Pitt's Head railway station co-served the village of Rhyd-ddu, Gwynedd, Wales, from 1923 to 1936 on the Welsh Highland Railway.

History
The station was opened on 1 June 1923 by the Welsh Highland Railway. It closed on 28 September 1936.

References

Disused railway stations in Gwynedd
Railway stations in Great Britain opened in 1923
Railway stations in Great Britain closed in 1936
1923 establishments in Wales
1936 disestablishments in Wales